Blue Mars may refer to:
 Blue Mars (novel), the third book in the Mars trilogy by Kim Stanley Robinson
 Blue Mars (video game), 3D massively multiplayer virtual world platform